The 1989 Chicago Bears season was their 70th regular season completed in the National Football League. The Bears were looking to win the NFC Central for a sixth consecutive season, but instead finished with a 6–10 record and missed the playoffs for the first time since 1983. The Bears’ offseason moves prior to this season had consequences for years afterward as the pieces from Super Bowl XX’s team slowly began to leave or retire.

Winds of Change 
In the winter of 1989 after Super Bowl XXIII, NFL owners and players ratified a new free agency plan. The plan would force teams to designate 37 players as "protected", with the rest becoming free agents able to sign with any team during the months of March and April. The first 1989 winds of change began to blow when the team left long-time veteran Super Bowl champion players Otis Wilson and Mike C. Richardson unprotected. Al Davis' Los Angeles Raiders signed both players, but neither would make the club that year and would be forced to retire. Another veteran of note unprotected was linebacker/defensive end Al Harris, who signed with Buddy Ryan's Philadelphia Eagles.

Changes to the organization and team continued throughout the spring. Longtime offensive coordinator Ed Hughes was "promoted" to the title of assistant Head Coach, which simply meant that assistant Greg Landry took over as offensive coordinator while Hughes was relegated to coaching receivers. Head coach Mike Ditka announced at this time that that starting quarterback position was up for grabs, meaning incumbents Jim McMahon, Mike Tomczak and 1987 first-round draft pick Jim Harbaugh would battle for the starting role. McMahon had started the previous NFC Championship Game but couldn't muster the team to more than three points, so his long-standing starting job was by no means safe.

The 1989 NFL draft 

What was good news for the Bears was that for the second straight season, they owned multiple picks in the first round of the draft. 1988 had brought young offensive talent in receiver Wendell Davis and running back Brad Muster, and in 1989 it was thought that urgent help would be needed on defense, with the loss of Wilson, Richardson, and Harris. Additional depth on the defensive line was needed as well, given that William Perry and Richard Dent had missed significant time in 1988 due to injury.

Not only did the Bears have two first-rounders in 1989, they actually had three. They owned their own pick, number 25, and also had the 11th pick from the Raiders as part of the 1988 Willie Gault trade, and the 12th from the Washington Redskins for Wilber Marshall following the 1987 NFL Season. On draft day, the Bears selected cornerback Donnell Woolford 11th overall, then spent the 12th pick on Florida defensive end Trace Armstrong. Feeling good about the first two picks, and needing additional depth, the Bears traded the 25th pick to the Miami Dolphins for their high second and third-round picks. Additional wheeling and dealing gave the Bears a whopping 20 selections over the Draft's 12 rounds. Eight of those players made the team and contributed. One that did not was ninth-round pick Byron Sanders from Northwestern. Byron's brother Barry had been selected by the Detroit Lions with the third overall selection. In Armstrong, Woolford, and John Roper, a linebacker selected with the second-round pick obtained from Miami, the Bears had their replacements for Wilson, Richardson and Harris. Chicago used the other pick obtained from Miami on offensive lineman Jerry Fontenot. Were it not for the two picks obtained from the Dolphins, and the two first-rounders the Bears would have had virtually nothing long-term from this 20-player draft.

However, it was not the 1989 Draft that would harm the 1989 Bears – although the '89 draft would have a lot to do with the demise of the team leading up to Ditka's dismissal three years later. One of the nails in the '89 coffin were failures high in the 1985–1988 drafts. A second-rounder was blown in 1985 on cornerback Reggie Phillips, released in 1988. 1989's second 2nd round pick was tackle Dave Zawatson, who did not make the 1990 roster. Third-round busts were James Maness in '85, David Williams in '86, the pick traded for Doug Flutie in 1987, and Ralph Jarvis in 1988. Fourth-round picks such as Paul Blair ('86) and Sean Smith ('87) weren't much better. The San Francisco 49ers built their late-decade dynasty around middle-round picks like Tom Rathman, Charles Haley and John Taylor during those years, while the Bears failed to restock as the Super Bowl Team of 1985 aged. This, along with letting Pro Bowlers like Marshall and Gault leave, would contribute to their downfall for more than a decade.

Training Camp drama 
Training camp 1989 opened with the usual holdouts that were common in the 1980s, even though without free agency players had no real leverage. Steve McMichael held out briefly in hopes of renegotiating the contract he had signed the previous season, and William Perry, Dave Duerson and Shaun Gayle missed several days before signing. The Most notable holdouts were the first round picks, Armstrong and Woolford. The former missed the first three weeks of camp, while the latter didn't sign until after the first preseason game. These holdouts would trigger a unique change in Bears draft philosophy the following season.

The Bears quarterback problems 
When Ditka was asked about Jim McMahon's status, prior to the season, he declared he had no intention of a trade but would listen to any offers that came this way.  McMahon was traded to the San Diego Chargers days before the Chargers traveled to Soldier Field for a preseason meeting with the Bears.  Hughes retired from the team shortly after the McMahon trade, stating he lost interest in coaching and that losing McMahon had no influence with his final decision to retire.

Prior to traveling to Minneapolis to face the Minnesota Vikings in December, the Bears stayed for three days at the University of Wisconsin–Madison to practice in their indoor facilities.  There were protests by Madison residents over the university allowing the Chicago Bears to train in Wisconsin.

With McMahon gone, Tomczak started the season at quarterback, with Harbaugh backing him up.  Ditka felt good enough about the duo that he did not keep a third quarterback on the active roster.

Staff

Roster

Regular season 
First up for the Bears and starting quarterback Tomczak in 1989 were the defending AFC Champion Cincinnati Bengals at Soldier Field.  It was the defending AFC Champs versus the NFC runners-up, and the Bears endured 17-14, despite Tomczak throwing an interception on his first pass attempt of the season. Defensive lineman Dan Hampton, playing in his 11th season, sacked Bengal quarterback Boomer Esiason twice and blocked a field goal attempt. He also displayed refreshing candor in his postgame interview. Asked to comment on fullback Brad Muster's fumble with 1:29 left in the game, Hampton said:

The following week Chicago hosted the Minnesota Vikings, who had swept the Bears the previous season. The Bears and Vikings stayed close the first three quarters, with Chicago holding a 10–7 fourth-quarter lead. In the final period, the Bears busted out for four touchdowns, ultimately beating the visitors 38–7.

The Bears moved to 3–0 with a win in the season's third week at Detroit, when the offense racked up 542 net yards and 47 points. The Bears' expected strong start set up a miracle match-up for ABC's Monday Night Football, as the 2–1 Philadelphia Eagles traveled to Soldier Field to face the undefeated Bears. The week preceding the game was filled with the drama of the Ditka-Buddy Ryan rivalry. Despite brash talk from Ryan, the Bears prevailed 27–13 and embarrassed the visitors on many fronts. Ditka used his usual sarcasm following the game, stating:

Then they lost 10 of the last 12 games, for the worst record after a 4–0 start until the 2012 Arizona Cardinals lost 11 of their last 12 after winning four. One of the 10 losses came at Lambeau Field in Green Bay and became known as the Instant Replay Game. The Bears led late in the game, but the Packer quarterback Don Majkowski threw a controversial game-winning touchdown pass to Sterling Sharpe to give the Packers a 14–13 win. The loss was so hard for Bears head coach Mike Ditka that in the 1990 Bears Media Guide, he put the game in the 1989 game-by-game results as the instant replay game.

As a result of this season, the Chicago Bears were shown as being sued by a disgruntled fan in the L.A. Law episode "The Last Gasp."

Schedule

*Instant Replay Game

Game summaries

Week 1 vs Bengals

Week 3

Source: Pro-Football-Reference.com

Standings

External links

 1989 Chicago Bears at Pro Football Reference

Chicago Bears
Chicago Bears seasons
Chicago
1980s in Chicago
1989 in Illinois